Craig Vye (born 19 July 1983) is an English actor, best known for his role as Ethan Scott in teen soap opera Hollyoaks.

Early life

Craig was born in Hertfordshire, England. Vye trained at RADA, graduating in 2005. He was a member of the Big Spirit Youth Theatre starring in various roles such as Rosencrantz in Hamlet, Demetrius in A Midsummer Night’s Dream, Eiliff in Mother Courage, Augustus in The Importance of Being Earnest, Ralph in Lord of the Flies.

Work

Theatre

Television

Film

Personal life
Craig and his wife Amber got married in May 2009, Amber is a principal at a theatre arts school.

He is also a Tottenham Hotspur fan and is a contributor to their YouTube channel, SpurredOn.

Awards and nominations

References

External links

 
 
 Artist page at Rhubarb Voices 

1983 births
Living people
English male child actors
English male film actors
English male soap opera actors
English male stage actors
English male voice actors
Male actors from Hertfordshire
Alumni of RADA